Özkaya is a Turkish surname.

People 
 Ali Özkaya, a Justice and Development Party politician
 Serkan Özkaya, a Turkish-American conceptual artist
 Naci Özkaya, a footballer who competed in the 1948 Summer Olympics
 Özgür Özkaya, a footballer for Altay S.K.

Turkish-language surnames